HLA class II histocompatibility antigen, DR alpha chain is a protein that in humans is encoded by the HLA-DRA gene. HLA-DRA encodes the alpha subunit of HLA-DR. Unlike the alpha chains of other Human MHC class II molecules, the alpha subunit is practically invariable. However it can pair with, in any individual, the beta chain from 3 different DR beta loci, DRB1, and two of any DRB3, DRB4, or DRB5 alleles. Thus there is the potential that any given individual can form 4 different HLA-DR isoforms (2 alleles of DRB1 and two alleles from DRB3, DRB4 or DRB5).

Function 
The polypeptide subunit encoded by this gene belongs to the HLA class II alpha chain paralogues. The class II protein is a heterodimer consisting of an alpha (DRα) and a beta chain (DRβ), both anchored in the membrane. It plays a central role in the immune system by presenting peptides derived from extracellular proteins. Class II molecules are expressed in antigen presenting cells (APC: B lymphocytes, dendritic cells, macrophages).

Gene structure and polymorphisms 
The alpha chain is approximately 33-35 kDa and its gene contains 5 exons. Exon 1 encodes the leader peptide, exons 2 and 3 encode the two extracellular domains, and exon 4 encodes the transmembrane domain and the cytoplasmic tail. DRA does not have polymorphisms in the peptide binding part and acts as the sole alpha chain for DRB1, DRB3, DRB4 and DRB5.

Alleles
There are two different HLA-DRA chains in the human population coded by three different DRA alleles:

See also
 HLA-DR

References

Further reading